The  (lit. Tokyo Daily News) was a newspaper printed in Tokyo, Japan from 1872 to 1943.

In 1875, the company began the world's first newspaper delivery service.

In 1911, the paper merged with Osaka Mainichi Shimbun (大阪毎日新聞, lit. Osaka Daily News) to form the Mainichi Shimbun (毎日新聞, lit. "Daily News") company. The two newspapers continued to print independently until 1943.

References

Further reading

 

Newspapers published in Japan
Mass media in Tokyo
Publications established in 1872
1911 mergers and acquisitions
Publications disestablished in 1943
Defunct newspapers published in Japan
Japanese-language newspapers